Iniya Uravu Poothathu is a 1987 Indian Tamil-language romantic comedy film directed by C. V. Sridhar. The film stars Suresh and Nadhiya. It was released on 21 October 1987.

Plot

Cast 
 Suresh
 Nadhiya
 S. Ve. Shekher
 Cho

Soundtrack 
The soundtrack was composed by Ilaiyaraaja, and lyrics were written by Vaali.

Release and reception 
Iniya Uravu Poothathu was released on 21 October 1987, Diwali day. The Indian Express wrote, "There are points where the story lacks credibility and the film begins to drag but with lively comedy by S. V. Sekhar [...] and good work by Cho [...] the going is somewhat smooth." The film was also reviewed by Jayamanmadhan of Kalki.

References

External links 
 

1987 romantic comedy films
1980s Tamil-language films
1987 films
Films directed by C. V. Sridhar
Films scored by Ilaiyaraaja
Indian romantic comedy films